The Bristol S.S.A., (Single-Seat Armoured), was an armoured scout built at Bristol in 1914 to fulfill a French government order.

Design and development

At the request of the French government, Henri Coanda designed a single-seat armoured biplane. The forward fuselage was built as a monocoque shell built up from sheet steel, colloquially known as 'The Bath', at the Filton works. The armoured shell  enclosed the engine, fuel tank, oil tank and cockpit, with the pilot's seat being formed from the shaped rear bulkhead.

The  Clerget 7Z was fully cowled with sheet steel and drove a two-bladed propeller which had a large sheet steel spinner, perforated to allow cooling air to the rotary engine, and an internal sheet steel cone preventing bullet entry through the cooling holes.

Staggered biplane main-planes were mounted as far forward as possible to ensure that the centre of pressure maintained the correct position relative to the centre of gravity. The lower main-planes were attached to a framework, leaving a gap between wing root and fuselage.

The undercarriage consists of two wheels mounted on struts, with long skids which extended rearwards removing the need for a tail-skid. A feature of the undercarriage requested by the French customer was castering main-wheels allowing cross-wind landings.

Attached to the rear end of the armoured tub was a slender rear fuselage which ended with a large balanced rudder, tailplane and elevator.

Operational history
The sole prototype, given the serial 'No.219', was first flown at Larkhill on 8 May 1914 with a temporary aluminium spinner due to vibration with the steel assembly. The S.S.A. Also flew at Farnborough but was damaged in a heavy landing. After repairs the S.S.A. Was flown again on 25 June 1914 at Filton, by Harry Busteed, but broke an undercarriage bracing wire on landing. Despite the damage and without being repaired, the S.S.A. was delivered to the French customer at the La Brayelle, Douai, works of Breguet for repair on 3 July 1914. When the Douai factory was forced to be evacuated to Villacoublay by the German invasion of France at the start of the First World War, the S.S.A. was not taken along, and no further records of the S.S.A. exists.

Specifications (S.S.A.)

Notes

References

1910s British fighter aircraft
Single-engined tractor aircraft
Biplanes
SSA
Aircraft first flown in 1914